Ron Nevison is an American record producer and audio engineer. He started his career in the early 1970s as an engineer on Quadrophenia by the Who and Bad Company's debut album. He eventually became a producer, working with artists including Meat Loaf, The Babys, Led Zeppelin, Ozzy Osbourne, UFO, Michael Schenker Group, Survivor, Jefferson Starship, Thin Lizzy, Kiss, Europe, Chicago, Grand Funk Railroad, Heart, and Damn Yankees among many others.

Career Overview

Nevison's first work was as an engineer for the Who's Quadrophenia. From there, he did engineering work on the first three albums by Bad Company. He produced and engineered the Nightlife album by Thin Lizzy. In 1974, he engineered Led Zeppelin's Physical Graffiti.

Nevison also worked with Ozzy Osbourne on The Ultimate Sin, Shooting Star on Silent Scream, Kiss on Crazy Nights and both Damn Yankees albums.

Nevison has been recognized four times as Billboard Magazine's Top-5 Producer of the Year and has been nominated for several Grammys.

See also 
 Ronnie Lane's Mobile Studio

Discography as producer (chronological, not complete)
 November 8, 1974 – Thin Lizzy, Nightlife
 May 7, 1977 – UFO, Lights Out
 September 3, 1977 – The Babys, Broken Heart
 June 21, 1978 – UFO, Obsession
 1978 – Mike Finnigan, Black & White
 January 2, 1979 – UFO, Strangers in the Night ("Everybody agrees that Strangers in the Night is one of the best live albums ever," Nevison remarked. "Whatever complaints Michael Schenker might have, he can stuff them.")
 January 9, 1979 –  The Babys, Head First
 November 1, 1979 – Jefferson Starship, Freedom at Point Zero
 February 1980 – Survivor, Survivor
 April 2, 1981 – Jefferson Starship, Modern Times
 September 1981 – Michael Schenker Group, MSG
 January 30, 1984 – Grace Slick, Software
 May 30, 1984 – Jefferson Starship, Nuclear Furniture
 August 1984 – Survivor, Vital Signs
 April 15, 1985 – Shooting Star, Silent Scream
 July 6, 1985 – Heart, Heart
 February 22, 1986 – Ozzy Osbourne, The Ultimate Sin
 October 9, 1986 – Survivor, When Seconds Count
 June 6, 1987 –  Heart, Bad Animals
 September 18, 1987 – Kiss, Crazy Nights
 June 21, 1988 – Chicago, Chicago 19
 August 9, 1988 – Europe, Out of This World
 August 22, 1989 – Jefferson Airplane, Jefferson Airplane
 February 22, 1990 – Damn Yankees, Damn Yankees
 January 29, 1991 – Chicago, Twenty 1
 October 1, 1992 – Damn Yankees, Don't Tread
 April 27, 1993 – Vince Neil, Exposed
 April 11, 1995 – FireHouse, 3
 April 14, 1995 (Japan) – UFO, Walk on Water
 November 14, 1995 – Meat Loaf, Welcome to the Neighborhood
 August 28, 1996 – Michael Schenker Group, Written in the Sand
 May 10, 1997 – Michael Schenker Group, The Michael Schenker Story Live
 August 10, 1999 – Lynyrd Skynyrd, Edge of Forever
 October 11, 2000 - Dimonet, Attention Control Room
 2006 – Days Before Tomorrow, The Sky Is Falling
 2011 – Walden Waltz, Walden Waltz EP

References

External links 
 
 Quadrophenia engineer Ron Nevison, interviewed for Won't Get Fooled Again: The Who from Lifehouse to Quadrophenia

Living people
Year of birth missing (living people)
American record producers
American audio engineers